"İsyankar" ("Rebellious") was Mustafa Sandal's fourth CD single and third to be internationally released. It was recorded and released in 2005.

Track listing

Turkish release
 Track 1: "İsyankar" (Beathoavenz Cut) (featuring Gentleman) (3:51)
 Track 2: "İsyankar" (NAD Version) (featuring Gentleman) (4:06)
 Track 3: "İsyankar" (Sabor De Amor) (Punjabi MC Version) (featuring Gentleman) (4:01)
 Track 4: "İsyankar" (BH Real Mix) (featuring Gentleman) (4:23)
 Track 5: "İsyankar" (Kingstone's Senorita Remix) (featuring Gentleman) (3:13)
 Track 6: "İsyankar" (DJ Friction Club Mix) (featuring Gentleman) (4:21)
 Track 7: "İsyankar" (MeltDown Mix) (featuring Gentleman) (3:24)

German release
 Track 1: "İsyankar" (Beathoavenz Cut) (featuring Gentleman) (3:51)
 Track 2: "İsyankar" (NAD Version) (featuring Gentleman&Punjabi Mc) (4:06)
 Track 3: "İsyankar" (Sabor De Amor) (Punjabi MC Version) (featuring Gentleman)  (4:01)
 Track 4: "İsyankar" (BH Real Mix) (featuring Gentleman) (4:23)
 Track 5: "İsyankar" (Kingstone's Senorita Remix) (featuring Gentleman) (3:13)
 Track 6: "İsyankar" (DJ Friction Club Mix) (featuring Gentleman) (4:21)
 Track 7: "İsyankar" (Jansen & Kowalski Kicks Galore Remix) (featuring Gentleman) (4:43)

Charts

Weekly charts

Year-end charts

Notes
A remix featuring Punjabi MC was originally recorded for the album but taken out; it was later leaked onto the web in late 2005

References

2005 singles
Mustafa Sandal songs
2005 songs
Universal Music Group singles